Johnsonia is a genus of flies belonging to the family Sarcophagidae.

The species of this genus are found in Central America.

Species:
 Johnsonia bivittata Curran, 1928 
 Johnsonia borealis Reinhard, 1937

References

Sarcophagidae